The 1926–27 season was the sixth season of the American Soccer League.

Rule changes
During this season, the American Soccer League introduced two short-lived several rule changes:

 The league introduced goal judges similar to those used in ice hockey.
 A "penalty box" was also introduced, where players were required to serve penalty time standing behind their team’s goal line.

League standings
 The percentage is the percentage of points won of points available, not a win-loss percentage.

Lewis Cup

Bracket

Semifinals

Boston advanced, 8–2, on aggregate.

Brooklyn advanced, 4–3, on aggregate.

Final

Boston wins Lewis Cup, 5–0, on aggregate.

Goals leaders

References

American Soccer League (1921–1933) seasons
Amer